Ballindurrow is a townland in County Westmeath, Ireland.

Ballindurrow is one of 14 townlands of the civil parish of Multyfarnham in the barony of Corkaree in the Province of Leinster. 

The neighbouring townlands are: Multyfarnham to the north, Fearbranagh or Multyfarnham and Culleenabohoge to the east, Culleendarragh to the south and Heathland and Rathganny to the west.

In the 1911 census of Ireland there were 17 houses and 95 inhabitants in the townland.

References

External links
Map of Ballindurrow at openstreetmap.org
Ballindurrow at the IreAtlas Townland Data Base
Ballindurrow at Townlands.ie
 Ballindurrow at The Placenames Database of Ireland

Townlands of County Westmeath